JKL may refer to:

Bishop James Doyle (1786–1834), Irish bishop
Jingkelong, a Beijing, China supermarket chain
Jung-Kellogg Library, in St. Louis, Missouri, US
Jyväskylä, a city in Central Finland, Finland
Kalymnos Island National Airport (IATA code: JKL), Greece
Lucas Cruikshank, formerly part of JKL Productions
Jimmy Kimmel Live, an American late night talk show
JKL;, the home row keys for the right hand on a standard QWERTY keyboard for English speakers; see Touch typing